Patrick Stacy Murphy (born November 28, 1965) is an American softball coach and the current head coach of the Alabama Crimson Tide softball team. He was inducted into the Alabama Sports Hall of Fame on May 7, 2022the first softball coach to be so honored.

Early life and education
Murphy was born in Waterloo, Iowa, and raised in nearby Fayette. Murphy graduated from Fayette High School and completed his B.S. in history education at the University of Northern Iowa in 1988.

Coaching career

Early coaching career
While attending Northern Iowa, Murphy coached Little League baseball. After graduating from college, Murphy became varsity baseball coach at Sumner High School in Sumner, Iowa, leading the team to a 22–3 record in his first season of 1989 and the state championship game in 1990.

In 1990, Murphy began studies for a master's degree in communications at the University of Southwestern Louisiana (now the University of Louisiana at Lafayette) and joined the Lady Cajuns softball team as an assistant coach, where he would stay until 1994. Simultaneously, he was also head baseball coach at Independence High School in Independence, Iowa, from 1992 to 1995.

After one year as interim head softball coach at Division II Northwest Missouri State in 1995, Murphy moved up to the Division I collegiate level as an assistant coach at Alabama from 1996 to 1998.

Alabama
Murphy built one of the most successful college softball programs, taking Alabama to eleven Women's College World Series appearances (2000, '03, '05, '06, '08, '09, ‘11, '12, '14, '15 & '16) since 2000, which ties for first in the NCAA along with UCLA, both having made 11 appearances in that span. He led the Crimson Tide to its first national championship in 2012. Murphy also served as the hitting coach for the Canadian National Team in the 2004 Olympics and as an assistant coach for the United States national softball team in the summer of 2009.

On June 9, 2011, Murphy announced that he was leaving Alabama to take the head coaching position at rival LSU. Three days later, before signing a contract at LSU, he changed his mind and returned to Alabama— saying Alabama is "where his heart was".

On March 9, 2018, Murphy reached his 1,000th career win, becoming only the 38th coach to reach 1,000 wins. At 20 seasons coaching, Murphy reached 1,000 wins faster than any other coach.

Head coaching record

*Interim head coach.

Academic degrees
Northern Iowa, 1988 B.S. in History Education
Southwestern Louisiana, 1992, M.S. in Mass Communication

See also
 List of college softball coaches with 1,000 wins
 National Fastpitch Coaches Association Hall of Fame

References

External links
 Alabama Crimson Tide bio
 

Living people
1965 births
Alabama Crimson Tide softball coaches
Louisiana Ragin' Cajuns softball coaches
Northwest Missouri State Bearcats softball coaches
University of Northern Iowa alumni
Sportspeople from Waterloo, Iowa
High school baseball coaches in the United States
University of Louisiana at Lafayette alumni
American softball coaches